Santo Tomás is a Panama Metro station on Line 1. Construction of the station began on 16 August 2011 and it was one of the first 11 stations when the metro began operations on 6 April 2014. 

The station provides access to Hospital Santo Tomas and the Cinta Costera. It has hosted displays of sculptures and photography. In its first year of operations, Santo Tomas was the tenth most used station of the twelve on the network at that time, carrying 8% of the system's users at peak times.

References

Panama Metro stations
2014 establishments in Panama
Railway stations opened in 2014